

 
Pamayu is a locality in the Northern Territory of Australia located about  south-east of the territory capital of Darwin.

The locality’s name which is pronounced as "Bama-yu" is derived from the local Djingli aboriginal people’s name for the site where the Powell Creek Telegraph Station was located.  Its boundaries and name were gazetted on 4 April 2007 and fully surrounds the localities of Elliott and Newcastle Waters.  Its boundary with the locality of Elliott was amended on 20 January 2016.
 
The Stuart Highway and the Adelaide-Darwin Railway both pass from south to north on the western side of the locality.

Pamayu includes the following places that have been listed on the Northern Territory Heritage Register – the Powell Creek Telegraph Station and the Ucharonidge Station No. 1 Bore & Windmill.

The 2016 Australian census which was conducted in August 2016 reports that Pamayu had 33 people living within its boundaries.

Pamayu is located within the federal division of Lingiari, the territory electoral division of Barkly and the local government area of the Barkly Region.

References

Notes

Citations

Populated places in the Northern Territory
Barkly Region